Aníbal de Jesús Moreira (born 17 September 1966) is an Angolan retired basketball player and current coach. He is an assistant coach for Petro de Luanda.

Playing career
He competed at the 1992, 1996 and 2000 Summer Olympics with the Angola national basketball team.

References

External links
 

1966 births
Living people
Angolan expatriate basketball people in Portugal
Angolan men's basketball players
1990 FIBA World Championship players
Olympic basketball players of Angola
Basketball players at the 1992 Summer Olympics
Basketball players at the 1996 Summer Olympics
Basketball players at the 2000 Summer Olympics
Atlético Petróleos de Luanda basketball players
C.A. Queluz players
C.D. Primeiro de Agosto men's basketball players
Clube Ferroviário de Luanda basketball players
Point guards
Power forwards (basketball)
Basketball players from Luanda
1986 FIBA World Championship players
1994 FIBA World Championship players